Thomas Hoad  (born 22 March 1940) is an Australian water polo coach and former player. In 1968, he was appointed to International Swimming Federation (FINA), the world governing body for swimming and was chairman of the 1998 World Swimming Championships held in Perth, Western Australia.  He is currently a director of the national controlling body Australian Water Polo. He currently coaches juniors at Melville and at a state level in WA.

Hoad represented Australia in water polo at the Olympic Games four times, in 1960, 1964, 1968 and 1972, as well as being captain from 1964 to 1972. He was the Australian water polo coach at the 1976, 1980, 1984 and 1988 games.

Hoad coached the 'Fremantle Mariners' to three Australian National League titles out of an unprecedented nine consecutive grand final appearances.

He was a University of Western Australia sports star in 1964. He was made a Member of the Order of Australia (AM) in the 1994 Australia Day Honours for "service to sport, particularly water polo".

The Tom Hoad Cup is an international water polo cup named in his honour.  First held in 2003, it is played annually in Perth.

In 2009, Hoad was inducted into the Water Polo Australia Hall of Fame. In 2011, he was inducted into the International Swimming Hall of Fame. In 2021, he was inducted into the Sport Australia Hall of Fame as general member.

See also
 List of members of the International Swimming Hall of Fame

References

External links
 

Living people
1940 births
People educated at Aquinas College, Perth
Sportspeople from Perth, Western Australia
Australian water polo coaches
Australian male water polo players
Australian Olympic coaches
Olympic water polo players of Australia
Water polo players at the 1960 Summer Olympics
Water polo players at the 1964 Summer Olympics
Water polo players at the 1972 Summer Olympics
Members of the Order of Australia
Sport Australia Hall of Fame inductees
20th-century Australian people